The Partini were an Illyrian tribe that lived in the inlands of southern Illyria.

Partini may also refer to:
 Giuseppe Partini (1842–1895), Italian architect
 Ferdinando Partini, Italian painter

Italian-language surnames